Mankhan is a sum (district) of Khovd Province in western Mongolia. It is 80 km away from the city of Khovd.

It is home to the Khoit Tsenkher Cave, a UNESCO World Heritage site containing Paleolithic cave paintings. The localities of Ishgent Tolgoi, Khoit Uzuur and Khukh Khad are noted for their petroglyphs. Lower and Upper Paleolithic tools were unearthed in the sum in the mid 1980s.

Notable people
 Damdiny Demberel, long-standing member and since 2008 speaker of the State Great Khural, was born in Mankhan.

References

Districts of Khovd Province